The Back to the Future film trilogy and subsequent animated series feature characters created by Robert Zemeckis and Bob Gale.

The lead character of the series is Marty McFly. During the course of the trilogy, he travels through time using a DeLorean time machine invented by his friend Emmett Brown. He also encounters the central antagonist, Biff Tannen, in several different time periods and visits his ancestors and descendants.

Main characters

Marty McFly

Martin Seamus "Marty" McFly (portrayed by Michael J. Fox in the films and voiced by him in Lego Dimensions, voiced by David Kaufman in the animated series) is the son of George McFly and Lorraine Baines McFly. Marty travels between the past and the future, encountering his ancestors and descendants. Marty and his friend Doc Brown help restore the space-time continuum while encountering Biff Tannen (or members of the Tannen clan) at various points in time.

Emmett "Doc" Brown

Doctor Emmett Lathrop "Doc" Brown (portrayed by Christopher Lloyd and voiced by him in Lego Dimensions, voiced by Dan Castellaneta in the animated series) is the inventor of the DeLorean time machine. At various points in time, Doc helps Marty restore the space-time continuum and reverse the changes that were caused by time travel.

In 2008, the character was selected by film magazine Empire as one of The 100 Greatest Movie Characters of All Time, ranking at No. 20.

George McFly
George Douglas McFly (portrayed by Crispin Glover in Back to the Future, Jeffrey Weissman in Back to the Future Part II and Back to the Future Part III, voiced by Michael X. Sommers in Back to the Future: The Game) is married to Lorraine Baines McFly and is the father of Marty, Linda and Dave. Although he is one of the main characters in the first movie, George only makes cameos in Back to the Future Part II and Back to the Future Part III.

In the first film, George is portrayed as weak and the main target of Biff Tannen's bullying. The novelization of the film expounds on George's history of weakness, describing two incidents in which he is unable to stand up for himself. In 1955, in contrast with Marty, George did not have any friends for support and was targeted not only by Biff and his gang but also other kids in school. He has a penchant for science fiction, and writes some of his own but never allows himself to share them with anyone due to his fear of rejection. In 1955, with Marty's help, he gets the courage to stand up to Biff, knocking him unconscious. As a result, he and Lorraine fall in love and George becomes popular in school for defeating Biff in a fight. In the new future, they are both married with George working as a college professor and being a successful writer who orders Biff around. In the dystopian timeline in Part II, George was murdered by Biff in 1973.

George's character was greatly reduced in the sequels, and the role was recast. Weissman wore prosthetics to resemble Glover and imitated Glover's rendering of McFly, and his scenes were spliced with shots of Glover from Back to the Future. The result was so convincing that many people were fooled by it. However, Glover did not appreciate this and sued. The lawsuit resulted in the adoption of stricter rules by the Screen Actors Guild to prevent this situation from occurring again.

Lorraine Baines-McFly
Lorraine Baines-McFly (portrayed by Lea Thompson, voiced by Aimee Miles in Back to the Future: The Game) is married to George McFly and the mother of Marty, Linda and Dave. She is the oldest daughter of Sam (George DiCenzo) and Stella (Frances Lee McCain) Baines, and sister of Milton (Jason Hervey), Sally (Maia Brewton), Toby, and Joey.

In Back to the Future, Lorraine is initially portrayed in 1985 as middle-aged and unhappy. After Marty changes the timeline, she is shown to be fit and happily married to George in 1985. In Part II, Lorraine is still happily married to George in 2015 but they are constantly disappointed in Marty for giving in to peer pressures that make his life difficult. In the alternate 1985 timeline, she is widowed and married to Biff Tannen.

Clara Clayton
Clara Clayton (portrayed by Mary Steenburgen in both Back to the Future Part III and the animated series) is married to Doc Brown and is the mother of Jules and Verne Brown.

Clara moved to Hill Valley and originally died in an accident when her wagon plummeted into Shonash Ravine, which was renamed Clayton Ravine in her memory. This later changed after Doc rescued her, with Mayor Herburt naming it Eastwood Ravine in honor of Marty's alias Clint Eastwood, remembered as a town hero who saved Clara, defeated Buford Tannen, and allegedly died trying to stop two bandits who hijacked a locomotive. The animated series reveals that Clara, along with the rest of the family, moves to the early 1990s and lives in a farmhouse outside of Hill Valley. She then becomes a teacher at Hill Valley Elementary School.

Jennifer Parker
Jennifer Jane Parker (portrayed by Claudia Wells in the first film and voiced by her in Back to the Future: The Game, Elisabeth Shue in the second and third film, voiced by Cathy Cavadini in the animated series) is dating Marty McFly. In 2015 as seen in Back to the Future Part II, they are married.

In 1985, Jennifer attends Hill Valley High School, along with her boyfriend Marty. In the animated series, Jennifer is enrolled to Hill Valley College with Marty after graduating high school and working part-time as a tutor. She lives with her family on a ranch, the deed to which was owned by Biff Tannen, after one of his ancestors forced Jennifer's great-great-grandfather to sign it over by holding Jennifer's great-great-grandmother hostage. In the episode "A Friend in Deed", Marty travels back in time to 1875 and sabotages the deal with help from Jules and Verne.

In the future witnessed in Back to the Future Part II, Jennifer and Marty had two children, Marlene and Marty Jr. (both played by Michael J. Fox).

Melora Hardin was initially cast in the role, to appear alongside Eric Stoltz's Marty McFly. After Stoltz was fired from the production and Michael J. Fox was brought in, Claudia Wells was cast to portray the character, as Hardin was deemed too tall to appear next to the much shorter Fox. However, Wells was not available to film the sequels for personal reasons, and the role was recast to Elisabeth Shue although Wells reprised her role as Jennifer in Back to the Future: The Game as a punk rock version of her character. Consequently, the opening scene of Back to the Future Part II was re-shot with Shue taking Wells' place, rather than using the ending of Back to the Future.

Biff Tannen

Biff Howard Tannen (portrayed by Thomas F. Wilson) is the main antagonist of the first two films, and a local bully who harassed George McFly and managed to alter history in the second film. He comes from a long line of bullies in Hill Valley, most of whom harassed members of the McFly family, including Buford "Mad Dog" Tannen (also portrayed by Wilson, in Part III), who is one of Hill Valley's outlaws during the 1880s.

McFly family

Dave McFly
David "Dave" McFly (portrayed by Marc McClure) is the eldest child of George and Lorraine McFly. In 1985, before Marty went to 1955, Dave works at Burger King, but in the post-time travel 1985, he wears a suit as a nondescript white-collar worker for an accounting firm. In a deleted scene from Part II, the alternate 1985 timeline shows that Dave is an alcoholic and a gambling addict following George's death and Lorraine's second marriage to Biff Tannen.

Linda McFly
Linda McFly (portrayed by Wendie Jo Sperber) is the middle child and only daughter of George and Lorraine McFly. In 1985 before Marty went to 1955, Linda is having boy trouble and it is unknown if she is in college or has a job. In 1985 after Marty went to 1955, Linda works in a boutique and has gained the attention of many boys.

Seamus and Maggie McFly
Seamus and Maggie McFly (portrayed by Michael J. Fox and Lea Thompson) are Irish immigrants and the paternal great-great-grandparents of Marty McFly. In Part III, Marty is befriended by Seamus and Maggie. While Maggie does not trust the "strange young man", Seamus has a familiar feeling about him and believes that helping him is the right thing to do. They have a son named William (Marty's great-grandfather). Much like his descendants, Seamus is harassed by a member of the Tannen family, Buford Tannen. He also had a brother, Martin, who was fatally stabbed prior to the film's events.

Maggie McFly is played by Lea Thompson, who also plays Marty's mother Lorraine, even though Maggie is not an ancestor of Lorraine; in a DVD commentary track for Part III, Bob Gale states that the creative team considered it important to include Thompson in the film, and he imagines that McFly men are simply "genetically predisposed" to be attracted to women who look like her.

William McFly
William "Willie" McFly (voiced by Michael J. Fox in Back to the Future: The Game) is the son of Seamus and Maggie McFly as well as Marty's great-grandfather. Baby Willie was played by Lindsay Clark. She left acting shortly after this role.

Arthur McFly and Sylvia Miskin
Arthur "Artie" McFly and Sylvia Miskin (stage name "Trixie Trotter") are Marty's grandparents introduced in Back to the Future: The Game and voiced by Michael X. Sommers and Melissa Hutchison respectively.

Marty Jr. and Marlene McFly
Marty Jr. and Marlene McFly (both portrayed by Michael J. Fox) are Marty McFly and Jennifer Parker's future son and daughter in 2015 in Part II.

Originally, 17-year-old Marty Jr. was to be arrested and sentenced to fifteen years in prison for joining a robbery initiated by Griff and his gang. Marlene attempted to help Marty Jr. break out of jail but failed and was sentenced to twenty years in a woman's prison. Doc and Marty prevented the event from ever happening.

Baines family

Sam Baines
Sam Baines was the husband of Stella Baines and the father of six children, including Lorraine, Milton, Toby, Joey, Sally, and Ellen Baines. He is the father-in-law of George McFly and the maternal grandfather of Marty, David, and Linda McFly.

Stella Baines
Stella Baines (portrayed by Frances Lee McCain) was the wife of Sam Baines and the mother of six children, including Lorraine, Milton, Toby, Joey, Sally, and Ellen Baines. She is the mother-in-law of George McFly and the maternal grandmother of Marty, David, and Linda McFly.

Milton Baines
Milton Samuel Baines (portrayed by Jason Hervey) is the second child of Sam and Stella Baines, the brother of Lorraine, Sally, Toby, Joey, and Ellen Baines, the brother-in-law of George McFly, and the uncle of David, Linda, and Marty McFly. He was 12 years old in 1955. In 1955, Milton liked to wear a coonskin cap, a fad inspired by the Davy Crockett film and television show, which Stella took off his head twice while Marty was eating dinner with the family, putting it back on both times.

Sally Baines
Sally Flora Baines (portrayed by Maia Brewton) was the third child of Sam and Stella Baines, the sister of Lorraine, Milton, Toby, Joey, and Ellen Baines, the sister-in-law of George McFly, and the aunt of David, Linda, and Marty McFly. Born in 1949, she was present when Marty McFly in 1955 had dinner with her family, but did not speak.

Toby Baines
Toby Baines was the fourth child of Sam and Stella Baines, the brother of Lorraine, Milton, Sally, Joey, and Ellen Baines, the brother-in-law of George McFly, and the uncle of David, Linda, and Marty McFly. He was born in 1951. On November 5, 1955, he sat at the dinner table with his family and Marty McFly, whom his father had hit with the car earlier that day. He remained silent while the guest was present.

Joey Baines
Joey Baines was born on August 28, 1954, to Sam and Stella Baines, and was the fifth child in the Baines family. In the early 1970s, Joey was Marty McFly's favorite uncle. Joey would allow Marty to do dangerous things, but would always be there to make sure he was all right. He spent many years in Folsom Prison. On October 25, 1985, he failed to earn his release on parole for at least the second time.

By the 21st century, USA Today ran an article on Joey Baines in their October 22, 2015 issue, titled Parole denied again, which mentioned that this was Joey's twelfth consecutive parole hearing to end in denial. He was serving a twenty-year term at Folsom for racketeering and had spent two-thirds of his life behind bars.

Ellen Baines
Ellen Baines was the sixth child of Sam and Stella Baines, the sister of Lorraine, Milton, Sally Toby, and Joey Baines, the sister-in-law of George McFly, and the aunt of David, Linda, and Marty McFly. Born in 1956 (roughly a year after Marty's trip to 1955), she moved to Chicago at some point prior to 1986.

Brown family

Jules and Verne Brown
Jules Eratosthenes Brown and Verne Newton Brown (portrayed by Todd Cameron Brown and Dannel Evans in Back to the Future Part III, voiced by Josh Keaton and Troy Davidson in the animated series) are the two children of Doc Brown and his wife, Clara, who named them after their favorite author Jules Verne.

The characters had minor, non-speaking roles in Back to the Future Part III but were further developed in the animated series. Jules, an introvert, mostly imitates his father's interests and mannerisms while Verne appears to be more outgoing and extroverted. Several plot points of the animated series revolve around either Jules or Verne altering history and the steps necessary to correct the damage.

In the Back to the Future game when asked about his family, Doc reveals that his sons are now teenagers and their parents are discussing what time period they should attend college at.

Copernicus
Copernicus is Doc's dog from 1955. Like his other dogs, Copernicus was used in many of Doc's experiments. When Copernicus died, he was eventually replaced by Einstein.

Einstein
Einstein (portrayed by Tiger and stuntman Dick Butler in the first film and Freddie in the other two, voiced by Danny Mann in the animated series) is Doc Brown's pet Catalan sheepdog. He later becomes one of the main characters in the animated series as the Brown family's dog.

In the first film, Doc successfully tests his time machine by placing Einstein in it and sending him one minute into the future. In the animated series, Einstein becomes anthropomorphic and smarter, helping Doc with his inventions for traveling to the past and the future.

Tannen family

Irving "Kid" Tannen
Kid Tannen (voiced by Owen Thomas) is Biff's father who only appears in the Back to the Future: The Game. Kid is a gangster who runs a local speakeasy in the 1930s Hill Valley. He, like the rest of the Tannen family, bullies the McFly family forcing Marty's grandfather Arthur to do his accounting. Kid is brought down with the help of Marty, a young version of Doc, and Arthur McFly. He later marries Edna Strickland and reforms from his criminal ways with her help.

Buford "Mad Dog" Tannen
Buford Tannen (portrayed by Thomas F. Wilson in Back to the Future Part III, Liam O'Brien in Lego Dimensions) is the main antagonist of the third film. He is the great-grandfather of Biff Tannen and the local town outlaw in 1885 Hill Valley. He was nicknamed "Mad Dog" by a newspaper reporter, due to his violent temper and propensity for drooling, a nickname Tannen greatly despises. Buford is cruel, homicidal, rude, and emotionally unstable. He displays a need for control and is brought down to childlike tantrums when he is humiliated or makes mistakes, whether it be something that happens to him or something he says or does. He is often accompanied by his gang (played by Christopher Wynne, Sean Sullivan and Mike Watson), and developed a feud with Marshal James Strickland and his deputies. Like his descendant Biff, he has a dislike for manure.

Griff Tannen
Griff Tannen (portrayed by Thomas F. Wilson in both Back to the Future Part II and in the animated series) is a grandson of Biff. He is part of a gang that also consists of Rafe "Data" Unger, Leslie "Spike" O'Malley and Chester "Whitey" Noguera. Unlike his grandfather and great-great-great-grandfather whose gangs only consisted of Caucasian males, his accomplices are one Caucasian male (Data), one Caucasian female (Spike), and one Asian-American male (Whitey).

In the animated series, Griff makes a brief cameo appearance in the episode "Solar Sailors" where his grandson, Ziff (also voiced by Wilson), is detained after he attempts to sabotage Marta McFly's space cruiser due to his hatred towards her family.

Griff's last name is never mentioned in the movie, which means he could either be the son of Biff's son Biff Jr, or the son of Biff's daughter, Tiffaney, but in the animated series, Ziff says that both he and Griff are Tannens.

Biff Tannen Jr.
In the animated series, Biff Jr. (voiced by Benji Gregory) is the son of Biff Tannen. Like his father and paternal relatives, he likes to bully and steal from children around him including Jules and Verne Brown with whom he developed a feud. In addition, Biff Jr. delights in vandalizing other people's properties. Biff Jr. lives with his father with whom he has an abusive relationship.

Strickland family

Gerald Strickland
Gerald Strickland (portrayed by James Tolkan) is the strict principal of Hill Valley High School. He is a descendant of Chief Marshal James Strickland of Hill Valley 1885. He frequently makes a great noisy show of sternly reprimanding his students for faults such as "slacking" or liquor consumption, although he himself is revealed to sneak a drink of alcohol at his desk at school.

There is a reference from Verne Brown that there is another Strickland who works at Hill Valley Elementary School as its vice principal.

James Strickland
James Strickland (portrayed by James Tolkan in Back to the Future Part III) is the chief marshal of Hill Valley in 1885 and an ancestor of Mr. Strickland. He also has an unnamed son (portrayed by Kaleb Henley).

In a deleted scene not included in the final cut, and in the movie's novelization, Strickland is killed by Buford Tannen. In the theatrical release Strickland simply remains absent for the latter half.

In the Back to the Future game, Edna Strickland in 1986 notes that James was shot and killed by Buford. Marty remarks that's a detail he doesn't remember, possibly a reference to the differences between the film and the movie novelization.

Edna Strickland
Edna Strickland (voiced by Rebcca Sweitzer) is introduced in Back to the Future: The Game where she is the sister of Gerald Strickland. She is somewhat nicer than her brother, but still set in her ways towards upholding strong morals and abolishing crime and laziness. After Marty alters her original timeline, Edna married Kid Tannen and became the stepmother of Biff Tannen.

Other characters

Marvin Berry
Marvin Berry (portrayed by Harry Waters Jr.) is an African-American jazz musician and electric guitar player whose band was hired in Back to the Future Part I to perform at the "Enchantment Under The Sea" dance. He is also the cousin of then-rising musician Chuck Berry. After injuring his hand while helping Marty McFly out of a car's trunk, Marty takes his place as guitarist in the evening's most important dance. When Marty subsequently performs Johnny B. Goode to the audience's excitement, Marvin immediately calls Chuck to introduce him to the new music style, thereby humorously implying that Chuck stole the song to further his musical career. This creates a time paradox, since Marty was playing a song made famous by Chuck Berry, before Berry wrote it, so the song either has no actual creator or Berry was essentially stealing a song from his alternate timeline self.

Otis "Old Man" Peabody
Otis Peabody (portrayed by Will Hare) is the patriarch of a 1950s farmer family in Back to the Future Part I. For some obscure reason, he decided to plant pines on his land; while his plan ultimately came to no fruition, the area was decades later converted into a shopping mall named "Twin Pines Mall" as a testimony to his efforts. The town sees Peabody odd including Doc Brown, who himself has a similar reputation. When Marty McFly makes his involuntary time trip back to 1955, he ends up crashing into Peabody's shed with the DeLorean and then flattening one of his two growing pine saplings while escaping. The farmer's family believes that the time-traveling car and its driver in an NBC suit are extraterrestrial. As results, according to a headline of the newspaper Hill Valley Telegraph with Peabody being photographed in a straitjacket, he is committed to a county asylum after claiming "'space zombie' wrecked his barn," and after Marty returns to 1985, the mall is found having been (re)named "Lone Pine Mall".

Douglas J. Needles
Douglas J. Needles (portrayed by Flea in Back to the Future Part II and Back to the Future Part III) is the rival of Marty McFly in Hill Valley High School. Like his school's alumnus, Biff Tannen, Needles also has his own gang and develops a rivalry with Marty (although he doesn't outright bully him like Biff did to George and has no relation to the Tannens). He often goads Marty into doing reckless things, leveraging on Marty's fear of being labeled as a "chicken".

Goldie Wilson
Goldie Wilson (played by Donald Fullilove in the first film) is a young man working at Lou's Cafe in 1955 who goes on to become the first black Mayor of Hill Valley in the 1980s. By 1985, he creates a controversy when he plans to replace the damaged clock from the Hill Valley Courthouse's clock tower, which continues in 2015 after he left the office. A campaign poster shows the name Goldie in quotation marks, suggesting Goldie is a nickname, presumably in reference to his gold tooth.

He would also have a grandson, Goldie Wilson III (also played by Fullilove) who works as a car salesman in Back to the Future: Part II.

Match, Skinhead and 3-D
"Match" O'Malley (portrayed by Billy Zane), Joey "Skinhead" Unger (portrayed by Jeffrey Jay Cohen), and "3-D" Noguera (portrayed by Casey Siemaszko) are the three high school boys who make up Biff Tannen's gang in 1955. Their nicknames are only given in the films' novels, screenplays, and credits. Only one of their real names is mentioned in the movies – Biff refers to Skinhead as Joey in one of the 1955 scenes in Back to the Future Part II, while outside of the "Enchantment Under the Sea" dance.

In the alternate 1985, the three work in Biff's casino as his bodyguards. Each get their nickname from a distinctive character trait. Match often has a match sticking out of his mouth; Skinhead has very short, close-cropped hair; 3-D is always wearing a pair of anaglyphic 3-D glasses (a reference to the 3-D movies that were popular in the 1950s).

Spike, Data and Whitey
Leslie "Spike" O'Malley (portrayed by Darlene Vogel), Rafe "Data" Unger (portrayed by Ricky Dean Logan) and Chester "Whitey" Noguera (portrayed by Jason Scott Lee) they are high school kids who make up Griff Tannen's gang in 2015. Each one of them is also the grandchild of Biff Tannen's original gang. Spike is Match's granddaughter, Data is Skinhead's grandson, and Whitey is 3-D's grandson.

References
  Text was copied from Sam Baines at Futurepedia, which is released under a Creative Commons Attribution-Share Alike 3.0 (Unported) (CC-BY-SA 3.0) license.
  Text was copied from Toby Baines at Futurepedia, which is released under a Creative Commons Attribution-Share Alike 3.0 (Unported) (CC-BY-SA 3.0) license.
  Text was copied from Milton Baines at Futurepedia, which is released under a Creative Commons Attribution-Share Alike 3.0 (Unported) (CC-BY-SA 3.0) license.
  Text was copied from Joey Baines at Futurepedia, which is released under a Creative Commons Attribution-Share Alike 3.0 (Unported) (CC-BY-SA 3.0) license.
  Text was copied from Sally Baines at Futurepedia, which is released under a Creative Commons Attribution-Share Alike 3.0 (Unported) (CC-BY-SA 3.0) license.
  Text was copied from Ellen Baines at Futurepedia, which is released under a Creative Commons Attribution-Share Alike 3.0 (Unported) (CC-BY-SA 3.0) license.

Back to the Future